Julia Schneider (born 5 March 1990) is a German administrative scientist and politician of Alliance 90/The Greens who is serving as a member of the Abgeordnetenhaus of Berlin since 2021.

Life, education and career
Schneider was born in East Berlin in 1990, shortly before German reunification. She grew up in Neu-Hohenschönhausen and later Freiburg im Breisgau. After completing secondary school, she studied German-Spanish studies at the University of Regensburg and the Complutense University of Madrid from 2010 to 2013, graduating with a Bachelor of Arts. This was followed by further studies at the European University Viadrina in Frankfurt an der Oder, where she earned a Master of Arts in intercultural communication studies in 2016 and another in European studies in 2016. In 2020, she completed a postgraduate course in administrative sciences at Speyer University.

Schneider speaks German, English, Spanish, French, and Polish.

After her studies, Schneider moved to Berlin and became a research assistant at the Bundestag, where she worked for Greens MdB Sven-Christian Kindler from 2017 to 2018. She was then a trainee at the Department for Interior and Sports in the Senate of Berlin from 2018 to 2020. In February 2021, she became a civil servant in the transport department.

Politics
Schneider joined the Greens in 2017. From 2020 to 2021, she was a member of the executive of the party's Pankow district association. In 2021, she was nominated as candidate for the Pankow 7 constituency in the 2021 Berlin state election as well as 31st position on the state party list. She was elected to the Abgeordnetenhaus of Berlin, winning Pankow 7 with 30.7% of votes. She became deputy chair of the Greens parliamentary group and spokeswoman for personnel and administration, budget policy, and forest policy.

References

External links

1990 births
Living people
Alliance 90/The Greens politicians
Members of the Abgeordnetenhaus of Berlin
21st-century German politicians
21st-century German women politicians